Misamis Institute of Technology is a private, non-sectarian, co-educational institution of higher learning in Ozamiz City, Misamis Occidental, Philippines. It offers maritime courses such as Bs Marine Transportation (Nautical), Bs Marine Engineering;Bs in Office Administration;Bs in Computer Science;2 years Computer Secretarial; and 2 years Computer Technology.

The Misamis Institute of Technology headed by Captain Rene Abadies Maglasang in Ozamiz City and recognized by CHED and MARINA Philippines..

External links
Mindanao Economic Development Council

Universities and colleges in Misamis Occidental
Education in Ozamiz